Astringin is a stilbenoid, the 3-β-D-glucoside of piceatannol. It can be found in the bark of Picea sitchensis or Picea abies (Norway spruce).

It is also present in Vitis vinifera cells cultures and in wine.

See also 
Phenolic compounds in wine

References 

Stilbenoid glycosides
Phenol glucosides